Arun Mukherjee or Arun Mukhopadhyay is a Bengali actor who started his career in films with Kshudhita Pashan in 1960 followed by his performance in Satyajit Ray's 1962 film Kanchenjunga. Other films he was in include Ekdin Pratidin, Sabuj Dwiper Raja, Parashuramer Kuthar, Mansur Miyar Ghora and the 2019's Basu Paribar.
He had won National Film Award for Best Actor for the film Parashuramer Kuthar. His sons, Suman Mukhopadhyay and Sujan Mukhopadhyay both are popular as director and actor, respectively.

References

Bengali writers
Bengali Hindus
Indian theatre directors
Indian male dramatists and playwrights
Living people
Bengali theatre personalities
Best Actor National Film Award winners
Year of birth missing (living people)
20th-century Bengalis
Dramatists and playwrights from West Bengal
Recipients of the Sangeet Natak Akademi Award